Gridiron Australia is the governing body of American football in Australia. It is an approved sporting association under federal government regulations and is a member of the International Federation of American Football (IFAF). The organisation was formed in 1996.

Gridiron Australia oversees the country's national team, which has competed in the IFAF World Cup. It is a governing body of the state-level leagues and does not manage a national-level league itself. Seven out of the eight Australian states and territories run leagues; a total of 70 teams consisting of approximately 3000 players. Only six of the eight state leagues are currently registered under Gridiron Australia. Leagues also provide state-level teams to the Gridiron Australia National Championships.  In 2012, the Australian Gridiron League was established by Gridiron Australia.

Organised gridiron has been played in Australia since 1983 and is always referred to as gridiron rather than football to distinguish it from the other football codes such as rugby league, rugby union, Australian rules football or soccer. There is no uniform gridiron season in Australia, with the leagues playing at different times of the year.

Australian Outback National Team

The Australia national team, known as Australian Outback, consists of 92 players chosen from all seven participating states, as well as international players interested in playing overseas. These players represent Australia in international competitions such as the IFAF World Cup, the Oceania Bowl, a recent Tahiti Football Festival and other national level events.

IFAF World Cup 
The 2015 IFAF World Cup was held between 9–18 July and consisted of seven countries (Australia, Brazil, France, Japan, Mexico, South Korea and the USA) playing twelve games at the Tom Benson Hall of Fame Stadium, Ohio.

Australia finished fifth after defeating South Korea 42-14.

The gold medal was awarded to the USA, silver to Japan and bronze to Mexico.

Tahiti Football Festival 
The men's Australian Outback National Team travelled to Tahiti to participate in the very first Tahitian Football Festival hosted by Federation Tahitienne Football American (FTFA). The purpose of this trip was to assist Tahiti with developing their own national team. American Samoa were invited to participate in the festival which had the intention of encouraging the growth of gridiron in the Oceania Region.

Australia played two games during the twelve day stay with winning results.

The first game was held on 27 July 2016, against American Samoa, which the Australian Outbacks won 40-14.

The second game was played on 30 July 2016, against Tahiti who the Outbacks defeated 82-6.

Member leagues and teams
There are 70 clubs that compete in full contact junior, senior and women's competitions in seven leagues nationwide. Representative teams are formed by players from across the league, not solely from the league's championship team. Gridiron Australia also includes non-contact touch football and flag football competitions and tournaments.

NOTE: (W)= Women's team registered under the same name as Seniors. (J)= Junior's team registered under the same name as Seniors.
ACT Gridiron - Championship is the Capital Bowl, representative team is the ACT Monarchs
Centurions Gridiron (J)
University of Canberra Firebirds (J)
Woden Valley Gladiators 
Sirens Gridiron (Women's Team)
Central Spears
Tuggeranong Tornadoes (Junior's Team)
Gungahlin Wildcats (J)
Gridiron NSW's men's Division 1 championship game is the Waratah Bowl and its representative team is the NSW Wolfpack
Central Coast Sharks (J) (W)
Nepean Ducks (J) (W)

Northern Sydney Rebels (J) (W)
Central West Giants (J) (W) only
Sutherland Seahawks (J)
Sydney Uni Lions (W)
Syndney Uni Cubs (Junior's Team)
UTS Gridiron (J) (W)
UNSW Raiders (J) (W)
West Sydney Pirates (J)
Wollongong Mustangs (J)
 Hunter Gridiron League 
Gridiron Queensland - Championship is the Sun Bowl, representative team is the Queensland Sundevils
Bayside Ravens (J) (W)
Brisbane Bears (J)
Brisbane Rhinos (J)
Brisbane Saints (Women's Team)
Cairns Rebels
Gold Coast Stingrays (J) (W)
Griffith University Thunder (W)
Logan City Jets (Women's Team)
Moreton Bay Raptors (J) (W)
South Brisbane Wildcats
Sunshine Coast Spartans (J) (W)
Toowoomba Valley Vultures (J)
Western Cougars (J)
South Australian Gridiron Association - Championship is the Great Southern Bowl, representative team is the SA Sharks
Adelaide University Razorbacks
Port Adelaide Spartans
South City Chiefs
Southern District Oilers
UniSA Eagles
Gridiron Victoria (not registered under Gridiron Australia)- Championship is the Vic Bowl, representative team is the Victorian Eagles
Ballarat Falcons
Bendigo Dragons
Berwick Miners (J)
Berwick Miners Diamonds (Women's Team)
Croydon Rangers (J) (W)
Geelong Buccaneers (W)
Gippsland Gladiators
Melbourne Uni Chargers (Women's Team)
Melbourne Uni Lions (Junior's Team)
Melbourne Uni Royals
Melton Wolves (W)
Monash Warriors (J)
Northern Lady Raiders (Women's Team)
Northern Raiders (J)
Pakenham Silverbacks (J) (W)
South Eastern Predators (J)
Western Crusaders (J)
Gridiron West - Championship is the Gridiron West Bowl, representative team is the WA Raiders
Claremont Jets (J)
Curtin Saints (J)
Perth Blitz (J)
Perth Broncos (Men's, Women's & Under 19's)
Rockingham Vipers (J)
West Coast Wolverines (W) (J)

Vincent City Ducks
Westside Steelers (J)
Gridiron Tasmania - Championship is the Tiger Bowl, representative team is the Tasmanian Tigers
Launceston Gorillas
Utas Devils
TasKeno Knights
Northwest Raiders

See also

Gridiron in Australia
List of leagues of American football

References

External links
Gridiron Australia website
Gridiron Queensland website
Gridiron NSW website
Gridiron Victoria website
Gridiron West website
SA Gridiron Association website
ACT Gridiron website
Gridiron Tasmania website

 
American football in Australia
1996 establishments in Australia
Sports organizations established in 1996